Trenchant may refer to:

People
 Michel Trenchant (born 1945), French slalom canoeist
 Jean Trenchant (fl. 1570), French mathematician

See also
 HMS Trenchant, several ships of the Royal Navy